This article provides a list of scientific, nationwide public opinion polls that were conducted leading up to the 2011 Canadian federal election.

Graphical summary

Campaign period

Pre-campaign period

Leadership polls
Aside from conducting the usual opinion surveys on general party preferences, polling firms also survey public opinion on who would make the best Prime Minister:

See also 
 Opinion polling in the Canadian federal election, 2006
 Opinion polling in the Canadian federal election, 2008
 Opinion polling in the Canadian federal election, 2015

Notes

References

External links
 Abacus Data
 Angus Reid Public Opinion Title
 EKOS Research Associates
 Harris-Decima
 Ipsos Canada
 Leger Marketing 
 Nanos Research

2011
2011 Canadian federal election
Canada